Kengbei station, is a station of  Line 21 of the Guangzhou Metro. It started operations on 28 December 2018.

The station has an underground island platform. Platform 1 is for trains heading east to Zengcheng Square, whilst platform 2 is for trains heading west to Yuancun.

Exits
There are 3 exits, lettered A, B and C. Exit B is accessible. All exits are located on Fengguang East Road.

Gallery

References

Railway stations in China opened in 2018
Guangzhou Metro stations in Zengcheng District